An éclair is a long, cream-filled French pastry. It takes its name from the French word for lightning. Éclair or eclair may also refer to:

People
 Jenny Eclair, British comedian

Arts, entertainment, and media

Fictional characters
 Éclair (Kiddy Grade), an anime character
 Éclair, a character from the anime Dog Days
 Eclair, a princess in the game La Pucelle Tactics
 Lightning (Final Fantasy), Éclair "Lightning" Farron is the main character of the video game Final Fantasy XIII

Opera
 L'Éclair, an opéra comique in 3 acts by Fromental Halévy
 Les Éclairs, 2021 opera by Philippe Hersant.

Brands and enterprises
 Eclair (company), a camera manufacturing French company
 Cadbury Eclairs, confectionery made by Cadbury

Ships
 Eclair, a French fire ship at the Battle of Palermo on 2 June 1676
 HMS Eclair, several ships of the name

Other uses
 Android Eclair, version 2.0–2.1 of the Android mobile operating system
 Éclair (typeface)
 ECLAIR, a commercial static code analysis tool developed by BUGSENG
 Éclair AC, an association football club from Haiti
 L'Éclair (automobile), the first car to participate in a motor race with pneumatic tyres

See also
Éclaires, a commune in northeastern France